Potomac Park may refer to:

 East Potomac Park in Washington, D.C., built on an island reclaimed from the Potomac River 1881-1917
 West Potomac Park in Washington, D.C., built on land reclaimed from the Potomac River 1881-1912